The McPherson Sentinel is an American daily newspaper published in McPherson, Kansas, United States. It is owned by CherryRoad Media after being sold to the company in 2021 from Gannett.

History
It began publication in 1887 under the title The McPherson Daily Republican and in 1959 changed to its current name.

Today the paper covers several communities in McPherson County, Kansas, including McPherson, Canton, Galva, Inman, Lindsborg, Marquette and Moundridge.

See also
 List of newspapers in Kansas

References

External links
 

Newspapers published in Kansas
McPherson County, Kansas
Newspapers established in 1887